The 2007 Crawley Borough Council election took place on 3 May 2007 to elect members of Crawley Borough Council in West Sussex, England. One third of the council was up for election. The Conservatives regained overall control of the council, which they had won at the last election only for it to later fall under no overall control.

After the election, the composition of the council was:
Conservative 22
Labour 12
Liberal Democrats 3

Ward results

Bewbush

Furnace Green (2)

Gossops Green

Ifield

Langley Green

Maidenbower

Northgate

Pound Hill North

Pound Hill South and Worth

Southgate

Three Bridges

Tilgate

References

2007 English local elections
2007
2000s in West Sussex